Rigan Rural District is a rural district (dehestan) in the Central District of Rigan County, Kerman Province, Iran. At the 2006 census, its population was 26,114 in 5,705 families. The rural district has 83 villages.

References 

Rural Districts of Kerman Province
Rigan County